The 2013 FIBA Africa Women's Clubs Champions Cup (19th edition), was an international basketball tournament  held in Meknes, Morocco, from November 22 to 29, 2013. The tournament, organized by FIBA Africa and hosted by Club Omnisport De Meknès, was contested by 8 clubs split into 2 groups, all of which qualifying for the knock-out stage (quarter, semis and final).
 
The tournament was won by Interclube from Angola.

Draw

Squads

Preliminary rounds
Times given below are local UTC.

Group A

Group B

Knockout stage

Quarter-finals

5th-8th place

Semifinals

7th place

5th place

Bronze medal game

Gold medal game

Final standings

Interclube rosterAngelina Golome, Astrida Vicente, Catarina Camufal, Elizabeth Mateus, Felizarda Jorge, Indira José, Italee Lucas, Judite Queta, Meiya Tireira, Merciana Fernandes, Nadir Manuel, Ngiendula Filipe Coach: Apolinário Paquete

All Tournament Team

See also
 2013 FIBA Africa Championship for Women

References

External links 
 Championship Official Website
 

2013 FIBA Africa Women's Clubs Champions Cup
Women's Clubs Champions Cup
Africa Women's Clubs Champions Cup
International basketball competitions hosted by Morocco
FIBA